Jón Páll Sigmarsson Classic was an annual strongman competition consisted of international athletes from various countries. The event was established in 2010 by contest organizer Hjalti Árnason, who was both a childhood friend and a fellow strongman contestant of the late Jón Páll Sigmarsson. The competition took place annually for 3 consecutive years during the Icelandic fitness & health expo and included events such as max Deadlift, arm-over-arm pull, farmer’s walk, overhead medleys and Atlas Stones.

Event Results

References

Strongmen competitions
Sports competitions in Iceland
2010 establishments in Iceland
Recurring events established in 2010